Iju also known as Iju Oloko [idʒou ɔ:lɔkɔ], is a Nigerian town located in southern Ogun state and about 18 kilometers from Lagos state, a major commercial hub in West Africa. The town is inhabited mostly by Owu and Egba natives whose ancestors settled there between 1842 and 1845.

History
In the mid 19th century after the Egbas and Owus military occupation of the areas that are geographically south of Abeokuta. a party of the Owu/Egba army settled in Iju as they found the terrain to be ideally suitable for ambush in a guerrilla warfare as the invasion of the Dahomean Amazons loomed. As the name implies, Iju was a dense forest. A river, locally called Odo-Iju, flowed through the thick vegetation of several trees with large canopies and into the Ologe Lagoon in Lagos. Before the Owu/Egba military occupation was a territory of the Ilogbos and the Ados.

Wars

Dahomey
Pre-Egba conquest, the Dahomean Amazons were notorious for terrorizing the Egbado, Ado, Ilogbo, and the neighboring communities through their countless raids for slaves. During this period, several people were captured and sold into slavery. A 5yr old princess Omoba Aina (also known as Sara Forbes Bonetta) was captured and enslaved by the Dahomeans after they killed her parents. Ifaremilekun Fagbemi (also known as Seriki Abass) was also captured and sold into slavery. Soon after the region came under Egba rulership, King Ghezo of Dahomey and later his successor, Glele, embarked on a conquest mission to annex Egbado and Awori territories (which included parts of Lagos) en route to war against Abeokuta. These were supposed to be routine conquests for the powerful kingdom that already received tributaries from several towns in Lagos. From the camps and towns under Egba authority, the Owu/Egba army fought the Dahomeans who were defeated in their quest by the army under the leadership of Akindele Gbalefa, Lapeleke and Awaye Sonlu on two occasions

The Dahomean wars were arguably the most significant wars ever fought in this region mainly because of the influence, the size and strength of the Dahomey kingdom. The victory was significant for the region as it preserved the Egba authority, prevented the annexation of Egbado and Awori territories and a war inside of Abeokuta walls. As significant as these wars were, the Egbado and the Aworis did not lead any military effort to defend territories that have been conceded to Egba. However, trusted Egbados and Aworis acted as spies for the region's Owu/Egba army.

War Camp
Gbalefa who acted as the Generalissimo of the Egba army established Iju in the thick forest as one of the many Egba command post in the region. Also, between 1842 and 1913, Iju remained the meeting point where issues of Owu/Egba interest in the region were discussed.

Economy
Early Owu/Egba settlers were mostly hunters, farmers and artisans whose products were transported to Lagos via Odo Iju (river). Canoe building was also fairly common, hence the name Iju Oloko. This translates to "Iju of canoes". Like neighboring towns such as Owode, Oke Odan and Ota, Iju is home to Idi-Iroko inter-country highway that connects the Republic of Benin and Nigeria. This highway facilitates the conduit of goods and services from the region to other parts of Nigeria and Republic of Benin, and vice versa.

Religion
Many of the Owu/Egba settlers were mostly adherents of Ifa and Ogun. At the time of settlement, Ifa was the ubiquitous religion in Yorubaland while Ogun was traditionally the religion of warriors, hunters, blacksmiths and artisans. However, by mid 20th century, many have adopted Christianity or Islam.

Government

Local Government
Ado-Odo/Ota is a local government district that was established in 1989 as a merger of Egbado and Awori communities. Though the district was formed from territories that are overwhelmingly Egbado land, most of the population are concentrated in the smaller the Awori region. Iju and several towns such as Ado-Odo, Owode, Sango, Igbesa, Ota etc make up Ado-Odo/Ota local government and are all under the Egba authority.

Native Government

Military settlements similar to Iju were founded in other strategic locations to protect trade routes within Egba territories outside of Abeokuta. A survey and map of the area drawn by Ilaro Divisional Native Authority in 1913 under the stewardship of Ifaremilekun Fagbemi for district planning recognized Gbalefa Peninsula as an area of native authority that encompassed Iju and other towns. The survey was deemed acceptable by Awori, Egba and Egbado representatives.

Egba satellite towns and villages are customarily headed by a Baale who acts as the town administrator and representative of Alake of Egbaland. In a bid to consolidate the authorities of the Egba Baales in the area called Gbalefa Peninsula, a member of the Gbalefa clan was recommended to be made king, but the Egba Administrative council rejected the recommendation on the grounds that no Egba king can be crowned outside Abeokuta. instead, the Egba satellite communities should have Baales. Another recommendation was made in 2017 and this time around, Oba Alake and Oba Olowu accepted the recommendation.

On November 2, 2017, the executive governor of Ogun state, Ibikunle Amosun, approved request to have an Owu/Egba king in Iju town. On November 11, 2017, Olufemi Sodeinde who is a High Chief in Owu Kingdom was crowned as the first Olu of Iju-Gbalefa Egbaland. In attendance were President Olusegun Obasanjo, HRM Oba Dr. Olusanya Dosumu and several notable dignitaries. The coronation was attended and live-streamed by thousands of people.

Industrialization
The neighboring Ota town which is closer in proximity to Lagos, the commercial hub of the country, is teeming with factories and banks, schools, restaurants and hotels. These economic activities are fueling unprecedented population growth in the local government district. Most of this growth may be the result of migration from Lagos to local government district.

Outside of Ado-Odo/Ota local government district, there are large geographical territories of the Aworis in Lagos state that are not under Egba authority. As the Awori population continues to grow at a fast rate in the local government district, they will be accommodated by the Egba and Egbado (now Yewa) population.

References 

 Ogunsiji, O. (1988). Pastoralism in Egbado division of Ogun State. Ahmadu Bello University, Zaria.
 Kola Folayan. (1967). "Egbado to 1832: the birth of a dilemma", Journal of the Historical Society of Nigeria, 4, pp. 15–34.
 Anthony I. A. and Niran O.(2015). "Yewaland: One Hundred Years Before and After 2014" Yewa Descendants Union, Abuja
 "Iwe Itan Ibadan" by Oba I.B. Akinyele, Olubadan of Ibadan, 1955-1964).
 "Iwe Itan Abeokuta" by Ajisafe, p. 73)
 "Owu in History" by Akin L. Mabogunje, John D. Omer-Cooper - 1971 p. 100
 "History of the Yorubas" by Johnson p. 149
 "The history of the Church Missionary Society : its environment, its men and its work. Volume: 2" by Stock, Eugene (1899) p. 108.
 http://www.ogtv.com.ng/iju-ota-gets-first-monarch-to-promote-development/
 Governor charges Oba Sodeinde to promote development http://www.gatewaymail.org/?p=9862

Populated places in Ogun State